General elections were held in India in April–May 1996 to elect the members of the 11th Lok Sabha. The result of the election was a hung parliament, which would see three Prime Ministers in two years and force the country back to the polls in 1998. Atal Bihari Vajpayee of Bharatiya Janata Party, the single largest party to win this election, winning 67 more seats than previous 10th Lok Sabha, formed the government which lasted for only 13 days.
 
The United Front was created and got support from 332 members out of the 545 seats in the Lok Sabha, resulting in H. D. Deve Gowda from the Janata Dal being the 11th Prime Minister of India. Later I. K. Gujral, took the command of the country but when Lalu Prasad Yadav left Janta Dal and formed his own party, 11th Lok Sabha was dissolved to get a fresh mandate from the voters for next 12th Lok Sabha in the 1998 Indian general election.

The Lok Sabha (House of the People) is the lower house in the Parliament of India. 4 sitting members from Rajya Sabha, the Upper House of Indian Parliament, were elected to 11th Lok Sabha after the 1996 Indian general election.

List of Members of the 11th Lok Sabha (15 May 1996 – 4 December 1997) elected:

Members
 Speaker
P. A. Sangma from 23 May 1996 to 23 March 1998
 Deputy Speaker:
Suraj Bhan from 12 July 1996 to 4 December 1997
Secretary General:
Surendra Mishra from 1 January 1996 to 15 July 1996
S. Gopalan from 15 July 1996 to 14 July 1999

Prime Ministers
Atal Bihari Vajpayee from 16 May 1996 to 1 June 1996 from Bharatiya Janata Party
H. D. Deve Gowda from 1 June 1996 to 21 April 1997 from Janata Dal United Front
I. K. Gujral from 21 April 1997 to 19 March 1998 from Janata Dal United Front

List of members by state 

The list of members as published by the Election Commission of India:

Andhra Pradesh

Arunachal Pradesh

Assam

Bihar

Goa

Gujarat

Haryana

Himachal Pradesh

Jammu & Kashmir

Karnataka
Out 28 Seats - JDS 15, BJP 07 and 06 INC.

Kerala

Madhya Pradesh

BJP: 28 seats out of 40; Congress: 9 seats.

Maharashtra

Manipur

Meghalaya

Mizoram

Nagaland

Odisha

Punjab

Rajasthan

Sikkim

Tamil Nadu

Tripura

Uttar Pradesh

West Bengal

Andaman & Nicobar Islands

Chandigarh

Dadra & Nagar Haveli

Daman & Diu

National Capital Territory of Delhi

Lakshadweep

Pondicherry

References

External links

 
 Terms of the Lok Sabha
1996 establishments in India
1998 disestablishments in India